A Different Sort of Solitude is a single by Steven Page. It was released January 17, 2012. It contains two non-album tracks. "A Different Sort of Solitude" was written and recorded for the film French Immersion. The b-side, "Manchild", was co-written with Craig Northey of the Vancouver-based band Odds. On the same day as the release of the single, the song received a Genie Award nomination for Best Original Song at the 32nd Genie Awards.

Track listing

References

2012 singles
2012 songs
Canadian pop songs
Songs written by Steven Page